Gordon Inkster (30 June 1893 – 22 March 1957) was an Australian cricketer and Australian rules footballer. He played in six first-class matches for South Australia between 1926 and 1928.

See also
 List of South Australian representative cricketers

References

External links
 

1893 births
1957 deaths
Australian cricketers
South Australia cricketers
Cricketers from Adelaide